The 2013–14 Gonzaga Bulldogs women's basketball team represents Gonzaga University in the 2013–14 college basketball season. The Bulldogs (also informally referred to as the "Zags"), members of the West Coast Conference, were led by head coach Kelly Graves, in his 14th, and final season at the school. The Zags played most of their home games at the McCarthey Athletic Center on the university campus in Spokane, Washington. The Zags would win both the regular and tournament season titles and finish ranked 18th in the AP Poll with a 29–5 record. The Zags were upset in the 1st Round of the NCAA Tournament to end their season. After the season, Kelly Graves would be hired as the new head coach at Oregon, and Lisa Fortier would be named the new Zags head coach.

Before the Season
Gonzaga was picked to win the WCC Championship.

Roster

Schedule
Source:

|-
!colspan=9 style="background:#002469; color:#FF0000;"| Regular Season

|-
!colspan=9 style="background:#FF0000;"| 2014 WCC Tournament

|-
!colspan=9 style="background:#002469;"| 2014 NCAA Tournament

Rankings
2013–14 NCAA Division I women's basketball rankings

See also
2013–14 Gonzaga Bulldogs men's basketball team

References

Gonzaga
Gonzaga Bulldogs women's basketball seasons
Gonzaga
Gonzaga Bulldogs men's basketball
Gonzaga Bulldogs men's basketball